Santa Rita is a planned community and census-designated place (CDP) in Williamson County, Texas, United States. It was first listed as a CDP prior to the 2020 census.

Ronald Reagan Boulevard, a western bypass of the Georgetown area, is the main road through the CDP.

References 

Populated places in Williamson County, Texas
Census-designated places in Williamson County, Texas
Census-designated places in Texas